Bite the Bullet is the second solo studio album from singer-songwriter Karl Wolf, released internationally first in 2007 under EMI Arabia. The Canadian release was April 7, 2009 by Lone Wolf Records, which was due in part to the successful single Africa that reached #2 in Billboard's "Canadian Hot 100" for four consecutive weeks on the charts dated between March 14, and April 11, 2009. The single was also certified 3× Platinum by the CRIA. The follow-up single "Carrera" peaked at #39 on the same chart.

Track listing

Chart positions

Awards and nominations

References

2007 albums
Karl Wolf albums